Vijyoshi is an annual national science camp in India organised by KVPY in collaboration with INSPIRE programme, IISc Bangalore and IISER-Kolkata. It is an abbreviation for Vigyan Jyoti Shivir. It started in the year 2009 and is funded by the Department of Science and Technology (India). The aim of Vijyoshi Camp is to provide a forum for interactions between bright young students and leading researchers in various branches of Science and Mathematics.

The programme includes lectures sessions followed by discussion sessions. The speakers at this camp are eminent scientists and mathematicians. Participants of this programme include KVPY fellows, INSPIRE scholars, 1st year science undergraduates studying in IISc, IISER's, IIT's, NISER and other central universities. In 2014 the camp was hosted by two institutions- IISc and IISER- Kolkata. A total of about 1200 students attended the camp in 2014.

Vijyoshi 2014
Some of the speakers for Vijyoshi 2014 included Physics Nobel Laureate Dr. Georg Bednorz, renowned Structural Chemist Prof. Gautam Radhakrishna Desiraju, and the director of the Indian Institute of Science Prof.Anurag Kumar.

Several Under Graduate Students from IISc also demonstrated over 20 experiments to the young students who visited the camp. Some of them were Non-Newtonian fluid, Stirling Engine, Leindenfrost Effect, Gyroscope, Equivalence Principle, Ripple tank and Coupled Torsional Pendulum.
There were also cultural programs performed by IISc students.

Details of Previous Camps

See also
 London International Youth Science Forum (U.K.) 
 National Youth Science Forum (Australia)

References

Science and technology in India